King Huan of Zhou (died 697 BC), personal name Jī Lín (姬林), was the fourteenth king of the Chinese Zhou dynasty and the second of the Eastern Zhou Dynasty (770–256 BC).

King Huan’s father was King Ping's son, Crown Prince Xiefu. Huan succeeded his grandfather in 719 BC.

The son and successor of Huan was King Zhuang of Zhou.

In 707 BC, the royal forces were defeated in the Battle of Xuge (𦈡葛之战) by Duke Zhuang of Zheng (r. 743–701). The king himself was wounded by an arrow in the shoulder, and the defeat destroyed the prestige of the Zhou house.

Family
Queens:
 Ji Ji Jiang, of the Jiang clan of Ji, a princess of Ji by birth; married in 703 BC

Sons:
 Prince Tuo (d. 682 BC), ruled as King Zhuang of Zhou from 696–682 BC
 Prince Ke, fled to Southern Yan in 694 BC

Daughters:
 Zhou Wang Ji
 Married Duke Xiang of Qi (729–686 BC) in 695 BC

Ancestry

See also
Family tree of ancient Chinese emperors

References 

697 BC deaths
Zhou dynasty kings
7th-century BC Chinese monarchs
8th-century BC Chinese monarchs
Year of birth unknown